McMahons Creek is a bounded rural locality in Victoria, Australia, on the Warburton–Woods Point Road bordering the Yarra Ranges National Park, located within the Shire of Yarra Ranges local government area.

History
McMahons Creek Post Office opened on 1 July 1865, closed in 1870, reopened in 1901 and closed again in 1968.

References

External links

Towns in Victoria (Australia)
Yarra Valley
Yarra Ranges